Petros Filaniotis (born April 13, 1980 in Nicosia, Cyprus) is a retired Cypriot international football who played as an attacking midfielder. AEL FC signed him from PAEEK FC. In January 2009 he moved to Ethnikos Achna FC for 3 years where he enjoyed a fruitful spell with 2 goals in his first two games and several assists.

External links
 

1980 births
Living people
Cypriot footballers
Association football midfielders
Cyprus international footballers
PAEEK players
AEL Limassol players
Ethnikos Achna FC players
Omonia Aradippou players
Digenis Akritas Morphou FC players
ENTHOI Lakatamia FC players
Cypriot First Division players
Cypriot Second Division players